The 1922 Chertsey by-election was a parliamentary by-election for the British House of Commons constituency of Chertsey on 24 March 1922.

Vacancy
The by-election was caused by the death of the sitting Unionist MP, Sir Donald Macmaster on 3 March 1922. He had been MP here since winning the seat in January 1910.

Election history
Chertsey had returned Conservative or Unionist candidates at every election since the constituency was created in 1885, apart from the Liberal landslide of 1906.
The result at the last General election was

Candidates

The Unionist's chose first time candidate Philip Richardson, who had won a Silver Medal at the 1908 London Olympics, for Shooting. He was a Shipbuilder who ran his business from Wallsend.
The Labour Party, who had run a candidate in 1918 left the field and the Liberal Party, who had not run a candidate in 1918, intervened. The Liberals also chose a first time candidate in Sir Hubert Gough, who had commanded the British Fifth Army during the Great War and had recently retired from the Army.

Result
The Unionists held onto the seat with a greatly reduced majority.

Aftermath
Philip Richardson continued as the MP until retiring in 1931.
Sir Hubert Gough did not stand for election again. The Liberal Party never managed to mount as strong a challenge again as Chertsey remained a safe Conservative seat throughout its history.
The result at the following General election;

References
 Who's Who: www.ukwhoswho.com
 Debrett's House of Commons 1922
 By-Elections in British Politics by Cook and Ramsden

See also
 List of United Kingdom by-elections
 United Kingdom by-election records
 

1922 elections in the United Kingdom
By-elections to the Parliament of the United Kingdom in Surrey constituencies
1922 in England
Borough of Runnymede
20th century in Surrey